Armin Theophil Wegner (October 16, 1886 – May 17, 1978) was a German soldier and medic in World War I, a prolific author, and a human rights activist. Stationed in the Ottoman Empire during World War I, Wegner was a witness to the Armenian genocide and the photographs he took documenting the plight of the Armenians today "comprises the core of witness images of the Genocide."

In the years following World War I, Wegner also voiced his opposition, at great risk to his own life, to the antisemitic policies of the Nazi regime. In 1933, he authored an impassioned plea to Adolf Hitler on behalf of German Jews. He suggested that the persecution of the Jews was not just a question of "the fate of our Jewish brothers alone, [but also] the fate of Germany." Noting that he was writing the letter as a proud German who could himself trace his Prussian familial roots back to the time of the Crusades, Wegner asked Hitler what would become of Germany if it continued its persecution of Jews. Answering his own question, Wegner declared, "There is no Fatherland without justice!" He was persecuted by the Nazi regime and fled after release from concentration camps.

After leaving Germany, he lived the rest of his life in Italy. He was later recognized for his anti-genocide efforts, including recognition by Yad Vashem as Righteous Among the Nations. His story and his pictures have featured in multiple later efforts to document the Armenian genocide.

Life

Education
Wegner was born in the town of Elberfeld, Rhine Province (now in Wuppertal) in the German Empire. Educated at first in Striegau (today Strzegom), he later pursued further study in Zürich, Breslau, and Berlin. Upon completing his doctoral studies in law, he joined the armed forces.

World War I

Wegner joined the German army at the outbreak of World War I, serving as a medic in Poland during the winter of 1914–1915, where he was awarded the Iron Cross for rendering care under fire. He rose to the rank of second lieutenant in the German Sanitary Corps, which was attached to the Ottoman Sixth Army. Wegner was part of a German detachment led by Colmar Freiherr von der Goltz, which was stationed along the Baghdad Railway in Syria and Mesopotamia; here, Wegner witnessed the death marches of Armenians during the height of the Armenian genocide.

Disobeying orders intended to smother news of the massacres (as the Ottoman Empire and Germany were allies), he gathered information on the massacres, collected documents, annotations, notes, and letters and took hundreds of photographs in the Armenian deportation camps in Deir ez-Zor, which later served to evidence the extent of the atrocities to which the Ottoman Armenians were subjected. At the Ottoman command's request, Wegner was eventually arrested by the Germans and recalled to Germany. While some of his photographs were confiscated and destroyed, he succeeded in smuggling out many negatives hidden in his belt.

Wegner protested against the atrocities perpetrated by the Ottoman government against the Armenian people in an open letter, published in the Berliner Tageblatt, submitted to American President Woodrow Wilson at the peace conference of 1919. The letter made a case for the creation of an independent Armenian state. Also in 1919, Wegner published Der Weg ohne Heimkehr (The Road of No Return), a collection of letters he had written during what he deemed the "martyrdom" (Martyrium) of the Anatolian Armenians.

Weimar period
In Germany after the war, Wegner married author Lola Landau, and became an activist espousing pacifism. His efforts during the aftermath of World War I and the fall of the Ottoman Empire explicitly advocated a separate Armenian nation as a path to reconciliation, which raised difficult political questions.  Likewise, Wegner tried to ascribe culpability to the Young Turk regime rather than the Turkish people as a whole.

In 1921 Wegner testified at the trial of Soghomon Tehlirian, the Ottoman Armenian who had killed Talat Pasha in Berlin. Wegner's role was only to confirm the scope and horror of the Armenian experience during the events that later became known as the Armenian Genocide. Talat Pasha, the former Minister of the Interior of the Ottoman Empire, had been sentenced to death in absentia for orchestrating the Armenian massacres; Tehlirian, though he killed the former Ottoman administrator in front of several eyewitnesses, was found not guilty on the grounds of temporary insanity. The documents of the sensational trial were collected into a book, Justicier du génocide armènien: le procès de Tehlirian, for which Wegner authored the preface.

In 1922 Wegner published Der Schrei von Ararat (The Scream from Ararat), an appeal for the rights of surviving Armenians. Toward the mid-1920s, Wegner reached the peak of his popularity as a writer and as a co-creator of German Expressionism. In 1927–8, he and his wife traveled to the Soviet Union and also visited the Soviet Socialist Republic of Armenia, where he met with several Armenians he had befriended in Berlin in 1918–1920. Based on his journey, Wegner authored Five Fingers Over You, the success of which made him a celebrity. The text described the underlying political violence of the Soviet Communist model, foretelling the advent of Stalinism.

Nazi era
On April 11, 1933, shortly after the Nazi boycott of Jewish businesses, Wegner denounced the persecution of Jews in Germany in an open letter to Adolf Hitler. On September 19, Wegner was arrested by the Gestapo, who imprisoned and tortured him. He was subsequently interned in the Nazi concentration camps at Oranienburg, Börgermoor and Lichtenburg, among others. He was released in 1934, and fled to Rome, where he lived under an assumed name. In 1939, Wegner and his wife mutually agreed to divorce.  He would later suggest, "Germany took everything from me... even my wife." In 1945 he married Irene Kowaliska.

According to Stefan Ihrig, Wegner was a "broken man" by the 1960s. Ihrig suggests that all of Wegner’s efforts ultimately failed, in particular due to the fact that he did not manage to save a single Jew from the Nazis.

Legacy

Wegner was awarded the Highest Order of Merit by the Federal German Government in 1956. His native city of Wuppertal awarded him the prestigious Eduard-Von-der-Heydt prize in 1962. In 1967 he was accorded the title of Righteous Among the Nations by Yad Vashem. A year later, he was invited to Armenia by the Catholicos of All Armenians and awarded the Order of Saint Gregory the Illuminator.

He died at the age of 91 in Rome. Some of his ashes were later taken to Armenia to be honored at a posthumous state funeral near the Armenian Genocide Monument's perpetual flame.

A 2000 documentary film, Destination: Nowhere (The Witness) directed by Carlo Massa and produced by Dr. J. Michael Hagopian, depicted Wegner's personal account of the Armenian genocide through his own photographs. Prior to the release of the documentary he was honored at the Armenian Genocide Museum in Yerevan for championing the plight of Armenians throughout his life.

Recalled by some as "the only writer in Nazi Germany ever to raise his voice in public against the persecution of the Jews", by the time of Wegner's death in Rome he had been "virtually forgotten" by the German people. He had never felt at home again in Germany after fleeing in the 1930s, and had lived out the remainder of his days in Italy.  The inscription on Wegner's gravestone echoes the dying words attributed to Pope Gregory VII in 1085.

See also
Witnesses and testimonies of the Armenian genocide

Notes

Further reading
 Alloa, Emmanuel, "Afterimages. Belated Witnessing of the Armenian Catastrophe", in Journal of Literature and Trauma Studies 4.1 (2015), 43–54 [on Armin T. Wegner's photographs] https://muse.jhu.edu/article/621137/pdf
 
  Tamcke, Martin (ed.). Orientalische Christen und Europa: Kulturbegegnung zwischen Interferenz, Partizipation und Antizipation. Wiesbaden: Harrassowitz Verlag, 2012.
 
 Armin T. Wegner and the Armenians in Anatolia, 1915. Milan: Guerini e Associati, 1996.

External links 
Armin Wegner's photography depicting the Armenian Genocide
Armin T. Wegner Society
Biography of Armin T. Wegner
Destination Nowhere: The Witness on Vimeo

1886 births
1978 deaths
People from Elberfeld
Photographers from North Rhine-Westphalia
Börgermoor concentration camp survivors
Photography in Iraq
Witnesses of the Armenian genocide
German Righteous Among the Nations
German humanitarians
Recipients of the Iron Cross (1914), 2nd class
Commanders Crosses of the Order of Merit of the Federal Republic of Germany
People from the Rhine Province
German male writers
Lichtenburg concentration camp survivors
Writers from Wuppertal